Clearview or clear view may refer to:

Entertainment
 Clearview (album), the seventh studio album by the Finnish rock band Poets of the Fall

Companies 
 Clearview AI, a facial recognition company
 Clearview Cinemas, a chain of movie theatres within the New York metropolitan area that is owned by Bow Tie Cinemas

Places

Canada
 Clearview, Oakville, Ontario
 Clearview, Ontario

United States

Inhabited places
 Clearview, Queens, a neighborhood in Queens, New York City surrounded by Auburndale, Beechhurst, and Bay Terrace.
 Clearview, Oklahoma
 Clearview, Philadelphia, Pennsylvania
 Clearview, Virginia
 Clearview, Washington
 Clearview, West Virginia

Other places in the United States
 Clearview High School (Lorain, Ohio)
 Clearview (Falmouth, Virginia), an 18th-century home
 Clearview Airpark, an airport located in Westminster, Maryland

Other places
 Clearview, South Australia, Australia
 Clearview Primary School, Rolleston, New Zealand

Transportation
 Clearview Expressway, a short expressway in Queens, New York
 Clearview (typeface), font family for traffic signs
 Clear view screen, a device used to keep rain or snow off of a vehicle windshield